Gustav Felix Flatow (7 January 1875 – 29 January 1945) was a German gymnast.  He competed at the 1896 Summer Olympics in Athens and at the 1900 Summer Olympics in Paris. Flatow was Jewish, and was born in Berent, West Prussia. In 1892, he moved to Berlin.

Biography
Flatow competed in the parallel bars, horizontal bar, vault, pommel horse, and rings individual events.  He won no medals, unlike his cousin and teammate Alfred Flatow. However, both were members of the German team that competed in the two team events, for parallel bars and the horizontal bar.  As Germany won both those events (the horizontal bar unchallenged), Gustav earned two gold medals.  He also competed at the 1900 Summer Olympics in Paris, but without winning medals.  He retired from gymnastics to manage his textile company, which he founded in 1899.

After the Nazi takeover in Germany in 1933, he fled to the Netherlands to find refuge but he was caught ten years later. On New Year's Eve 1943 he was jailed for fleeing and in February 1944 he was deported to Theresienstadt concentration camp, a combination of  concentration camp and ghetto. Theresienstadt was different that most of the concentration camps with two different objectives. One was for it to be a way station to the extermination camps. The other objective was for it to be a "retirement settlement" for elderly and prominent Jews. This camp was used to try to mislead the German people about what was really happening. This was the same camp where his cousin who was in the Olympics was sent to. His cousin had already died there in 1942. Less than one year after he got there Gustav starved to death. He was 70 years old when he died on 29 January 1945, months before the Soviet army liberated the camp.

In 1986 journalists discovered his urn, which is now entombed in Terezín near the site of the concentration camp.

In 1989, he was inducted into the International Jewish Sports Hall of Fame.

In 1997 Berlin honoured Alfred and Gustav Flatow by renaming the Reichssportfeldstraße (a lane) near the Olympic Stadium to Flatowallee (Flatow-avenue).  There is also the Flatow-Sporthalle (sports hall) at Berlin-Kreuzberg with a commemorative plaque for both.  The Deutsche Post issued a set of four stamps to celebrate the 100th anniversary of the modern Olympic games.  One of the stamps honors the Flatows.

See also
 List of select Jewish gymnasts

References

External links

 Gustav Flatow at Yad Vashem website

1875 births
1945 deaths
German male artistic gymnasts
People from Kościerzyna
People from the Province of Prussia
Sportspeople from Pomeranian Voivodeship
Gymnasts at the 1896 Summer Olympics
19th-century sportsmen
Gymnasts at the 1900 Summer Olympics
Olympic gold medalists for Germany
Olympic gymnasts of Germany
Jewish emigrants from Nazi Germany to the Netherlands
Jewish gymnasts
German people who died in the Theresienstadt Ghetto
Olympic medalists in gymnastics
Medalists at the 1896 Summer Olympics
Deaths by starvation
International Jewish Sports Hall of Fame inductees